

Champions
World Series: St. Louis Cardinals over New York Yankees (4-3)
Negro World Series: Chicago American Giants over Bacharach Giants (5-4-2)

Awards and honors
League Award
George Burns, Cleveland Indians, 1B
Bob O'Farrell, St. Louis Cardinals, C

Statistical leaders

Major league baseball final standings

American League final standings

National League final standings

Negro leagues final standings

Negro National League final standings

Kansas City won the first half, Chicago won the second half.
Chicago beat Kansas City 5 games to 4 games in a play-off.

Eastern Colored League final standings

†Homestead was not in the league, but these games counted in the standings.

Events
January 15 – The Cincinnati Reds purchase the contract of first baseman Wally Pipp from the New York Yankees for $7,500.
February 6 – The St. Louis Browns acquire catcher Wally Schang from the New York Yankees in exchange for pitcher George Mogridge and cash considerations. Although Schang is 36 years old, he will hold the job as the regular catcher for the Browns for the next four seasons.
April 13
In one of the greatest Opening Day pitchers' duels ever, Walter Johnson of the Washington Senators defeats Eddie Rommel and the Philadelphia Athletics, 1–0, in a 15-inning battle. Johnson strikes out nine and gives up just six hits.
Future Hall of Famers Tony Lazzeri and Paul Waner made their debuts in the Major Leagues. Lazzeri with the New York Yankees, in a 12-11 victory against the Boston Red Sox, while Waner does the same with the Pittsburgh Pirates in a 7–6 loss to the St. Louis Cardinals.
April 19 – Boston Red Sox center fielder Ira Flagstead ties a Major League record by starting three double plays in one game from the outfield.
April 27 – Future Hall of Famer Mel Ott makes his major league debut with the New York Giants and strikes out in his only at-bat.
April 29 – Future Hall of Famer Joe Cronin makes his major league debut with the Pittsburgh Pirates a 16–9 loss to the Cincinnati Reds at Forbes Field.
May 8  - The left field bleachers and grand stand roof at Fenway Park are lost in a three alarm fire. The cash strapped Red Sox use the insurance money to pay for operations, leaving a vacant lot where the bleachers once were. 
May 12 – Walter Johnson of the Washington Senators records his 400th career win when he defeats the St. Louis Browns, 7–4, to reach the rarely achieved milestone.
May 22 – The contest between the Detroit Tigers and Washington Senators is called after eight innings, resulting in a 6-6 tie.
May 26 – The New York Yankees defeat the Boston Red Sox, 9–8, for their sixteenth victory in row.
June 14- John McGraw, manager of the New York Giants trades outfielder Billy Southworth to the St. Louis Cardinals for outfielder Heinie Muller. The trade is a flop. Southworth goes on to become a member of the "Gashouse Gang" in St. Louis and becomes part of a dynasty. Mueller struggles at the plate and leaves the Giants after two unproductive seasons.
June 24 – At Sportsman's Park, the St. Louis Cardinals and Pittsburgh Pirates play to a 3–3 tie.
July 4 – The contest between the New York Yankees and Washington Senators is called after six innings, resulting in a 4-4 tie. It is Washington's second tie of the season.
August 11 – Tris Speaker of the Cleveland Indians hits his 700th career double, but Cleveland loses to the Chicago White Sox, 7–2. The double came in the third inning off Sox pitcher Joe Edwards.
August 21 – Ted Lyons pitches a no-hitter in a 6–0 Chicago White Sox win over the Boston Red Sox.
September 8 – Hal Wiltse and the Boston Red Sox defeat the New York Yankees, 5-2, to end their seventeen-game losing streak.
September 15 – At Dunn Field, the New York Yankees defeat the Cleveland Indians, 6–4. Nevertheless, the Indians take four of the six-game series to reduce the Yankees' lead in the American League to 3½ games from its peak of eleven.
September 23 – After fifteen innings, the contest between the Cincinnati Reds and Philadelphia Phillies at the Baker Bowl is called a 6–6 tie.
September 25 – Excluding the tie on the 23rd, the Cincinnati Reds lose their sixth game in a row, 6–1, against the Philadelphia Phillies. Meanwhile, the St. Louis Cardinals, who had been playing poorly themselves, clinch the National League title.
September 26 – The Philadelphia Athletics take their third game in a row from the Cleveland Indians, relegating them to the second place in the American League two games behind the New York Yankees.
October 2 – After scoring a run in the first inning on two hits, the St. Louis Cardinals are held hitless for the next seven innings by Herb Pennock. Jim Bottomley singles in the ninth, but is left stranded as the New York Yankees win Game One of the 1926 World Series, 2–1.
October 3 – Grover Cleveland Alexander gives up two runs to the Yankees in the second inning, but sets down the last 21 batters, striking out 10, in Game Two of the World Series. A three-run home run by Billy Southworth breaks a 2–2 tie, while Tommy Thevenow collect three hits for a 6–2 Cardinals win.
October 5 –  In Game Three of the World Series, Jesse Haines  pitches a five-hit shutout and hits a three-run home run as the Cardinals beat the Yankees, 4–0, to take a 2-1 lead in the Series.
October 6 – Babe Ruth hits three home runs to lead the Yankees to a 10–5 victory over St. Louis in Game Four of the World Series to tie the Series at two games apiece. His first inning curtain-raiser is a majestic 395-footer, exiting Sportsman's Park over its right field bleacher roof. His second homer clears the roof in right center, carrying 515 feet, breaking a window on the other side of Grand Avenue. Ruth's final foray, however, is the main attraction, carrying deep into the never-before reached centerfield bleachers, far beyond the 430-foot mark. Estimated at 530 feet, it is still deemed, as of April 2012, the longest home run in World Series history. On October 18, Reggie Jackson became the second player in history to hit three home runs during a single World Series game. On October 27, Albert Pujols became the third player in history to hit three home runs in single World Series game.
October 7 – Mark Koenig scores on a sacrifice fly by Tony Lazzeri in the tenth inning, giving the Yankees the 3–2 victory in Game Five of the World Series, to take a 3-2 lead in the Series.
October 9 – Grover Cleveland Alexander scatters eight hits in Game Six of the World Series, while St. Louis tee off New York at Yankee Stadium for a 10–2 romp that sends the Series to a seventh game.
October 10 – The St. Louis Cardinals defeat the New York Yankees, 3–2, in the decisive Game Seven of the World Series to clinch their first World Championship. One day after picking up his second complete-game victory of the Series, 39-year-old Grover Cleveland Alexander saves the game after fanning Tony Lazzeri with the bases loaded in the seventh inning, then proceeding to no-hit New York the rest of the way. The Series would feature thirteen future Hall of Famers. The series ends when Babe Ruth is thrown out trying to steal second base making it the only World Series to end on a caught stealing to this day.
November 30 – Bill Carrigan, popular Boston Red Sox manager who won World Series pennants for the team in 1915 and 1916, is drafted out of retirement in an attempt to resurrect the moribund Red Sox.
December 5  – St. Louis Cardinals catcher Bob O'Farrell is named National League MVP. O'Farrell hit .293 in 146 games and polls 79 points. Cincinnati Reds second baseman Hughie Critz is runner-up with 60 and Pittsburgh Pirates pitcher Ray Kremer (20-6, 2.61 ERA) is third with 32.
December 20 – Rogers Hornsby is traded by the St. Louis Cardinals to the New York Giants in exchange for Frankie Frisch and Jimmy Ring.

Births

January
January 2 – Stan Hollmig
January 3 – Harry Fisher
January 6 – Ralph Branca
January 8 – Dick Lajeskie
January 10 – George Strickland
January 18 – Bob Scherbarth
January 23 – Chico Carrasquel
January 25 – Frances Janssen
January 26 – La Ferne Price
January 27 – Bob Borkowski
January 31 – Tom Alston

February
February 5 – Hank Workman
February 6 – Sam Calderone
February 6 – Dale Long
February 7 – Mary Flaherty 
February 7 – Jerry Lane
February 7 – Danny Lynch
February 10 – Randy Jackson
February 12 – Joe Garagiola
February 12 – Ruth Williams
February 13 – Bob Habenicht
February 15 – Bubba Harris
February 16 – Howie Judson
February 17 – Jack Crimian
February 27 – Audrey Kissel

March
March 2 – Joe Taylor
March 4 – Cass Michaels
March 8 – Dick Teed
March 18 – Dick Littlefield
March 22 – Billy Goodman
March 30 – Dick Koecher

April
April 1 – Jake Thies
April 3 – Alex Grammas
April 6 – Ed White
April 8 – Pauline Dennert
April 12 – Walt Moryn
April 12 – Lou Possehl
April 15 – Bill Pierro
April 17 – Helene Machado
April 26 – Stanley Glenn
April 26 – Ruth Kramer

May
May 3 – Stan Jok
May 4 – Bert Thiel
May 6 – Dick Cole
May 9 – Ray Medeiros
May 12 – Rose Folder
May 15 – Fred Baczewski
May 16 – Rube Walker
May 17 – Irvin Castille
May 19 – Mike Kume
May 21 – Elmer Sexauer
May 24 – Willy Miranda
May 27 – Harvey Gentry
May 28 – Frank Saucier
May 30 – Kathleen Malach
May 30 – Dixie Upright

June
June 1 – Ray Moore
June 2 – Frank Verdi
June 7 – Roy Jarvis
June 9 – Roy Smalley Jr.
June 13 – Jeanne Gilchrist
June 14 – Don Newcombe
June 16 – Bob Miller
June 27 – Al Porto
June 29 – Bobby Morgan

July
July 5 – Roy Hawes
July 5 – Mario Picone
July 7 – Mel Clark
July 7 – George Spencer
July 8 – Gene Patton
July 10 – Harry MacPherson
July 15 – Jesse Levan
July 23 – Johnny Groth
July 25 – Whitey Lockman
July 26 – Bobby Herrera
July 27 – Doris Satterfield

August
August 1 – Erma Keyes
August 3 – Christine Jewitt
August 6 – Clem Labine
August 6 – Ralph Schwamb
August 10 – Elizabeth Farrow
August 15 – Jim Goodwin
August 15 – Barney Schultz
August 16 – Shirley Danz
August 25 – Bob Milliken
August 25 – Jim Suchecki
August 26 – Frank Barnes
August 26 – Alva Jo Fischer
August 28 – Bob Trice
August 29 – Al Naples
August 31 – Ruth Roberts

September
September 8 – Lou Sleater
September 9 – Ed Mickelson
September 10 – Helen Westerman
September 11 – Lois Bellman
September 11 – Eddie Miksis
September 12 – George Freese
September 16 – Kurt Krieger
September 16 – Roger McKee
September 19 – Duke Snider
September 19 – Murray Wall
September 26 – Mel McGaha
September 28 – Ozzie Van Brabant
September 30 – Robin Roberts

October
October 4 – Senaida Wirth
October 11 – Joe Ginsberg
October 12 – John Kennedy
October 13 – Eddie Yost
October 15 – Don Carlsen
October 20 – Leon Brinkopf
October 24 – Beverly Dustrude
October 26 – Dick Bokelmann
October 28 – Bowie Kuhn
October 28 – Rudy Rufer

November
November 6 – Harley Hisner
November 10 – Carmen Mauro
November 11 – Jacquelyn Kelley
November 12 – Don Johnson
November 13 – Steve Lembo
November 16 – Amy Irene Applegren
November 17 – Naomi Meier
November 18 – Roy Sievers
November 19 – Bob Thorpe
November 22 – Lew Burdette
November 23 – Charlie Osgood

December
December 3 – Al Corwin
December 4 – Julie Gutz
December 7 – Armando Roche
December 10 – Leo Cristante
December 11 – Johnny Gray
December 13 – Carl Erskine
December 17 – Ray Jablonski
December 25 – Dick Manville
December 29 – Tom Upton

Deaths

January–February
January 12 – Michael Campbell, 76[?], Irish first baseman for the 1873 Elizabeth Resolutes of the National Association of Professional Base Ball Players.
January 27 – Bill McCauley, 56, shortstop for the 1895 Washington Senators of the National League.
January 31 – Lou Bierbauer, 60, second baseman for Philadelphia and Pittsburgh teams who batted .300 three times, while leading the National League in fielding percentage in the 1892 season.
February 10 – Frank J. Farrell, 60, New York City politician prominent in horse-racing circles who, with William Stephen Devery, bought the original Baltimore Orioles of the American League in 1902, moved them to New York as the Highlanders in 1903, and sold them (as the New York Yankees) to Jacob Ruppert and Tillinghast L'Hommedieu Huston in 1915.
February 10 – Charlie Krehmeyer, 62, catcher and outfielder who played from to 1885 for the NL St. Louis Browns, AA Louisville Colonels and UA St. Louis Maroons.
February 12 – Francis Richter, 72, sportswriter, editor of annual Reach Guides since 1901, revered for his authoritative commentary on the state of the sport; established first newspaper sports department in 1872, founded Sporting Life newspaper in 1883; helped form 1882 American Association, assisted in 1891 merger with the National League, while renouncing NL presidency in 1907.
February 14 – Gil Whitehouse, 32, right fielder for the 1912 Boston Braves (NL) and the 1915 Newark Peppers (FL).
February 20 – Ed High, 52, pitcher for the 1901 Detroit Tigers of the American League.
February 23 – Hi Church, 62, outfielder for the 1890 Brooklyn Gladiators of the American Association.
February 24 – Eddie Plank, 50, Hall of Fame pitcher for the Philadelphia Athletics from 1901 to 1914, who became the first left-hander to win 200 games, continuing until he had compiled 326 victories, including eight 20-win seasons, a two-hit victory in final game of 1913 World Series, 2246 strikeouts and 69 shutouts, being the top left-hander with 410 complete games, and setting American League career marks for left-handers in games, innings and starts.
February 25 – Otto Hess, 47, Swiss pitcher who played for the AL Cleveland Bronchos/Naps (1902–1908) and the NL Boston Braves (1912–1915).
February 27 – Otis Clymer, 50, right fielder for the Senators, Pirates, Cubs and Braves in six seasons between 1905 and 1913.

March–May
March 8 – Howard Armstrong, 36, pitcher for the AL Philadelphia Athletics during the 1911 season.
March 19 – Wild Bill Hutchinson, 66, pitcher for the Colts, White Stockings, Browns and Cowboys between 1884 and 1897, who led the National League in wins from 1890 to 1892 (41, 44 and 36), averaging 596 innings in each of these seasons, while retiring with a 182-162 record and a 3.59 ERA in 356 games.
March 27 – Kick Kelly, 69, umpire in the 1880s who officiated in three World Championship Series; played 16 games in 1879 with Syracuse and Troy, also managed Louisville.
April 1 – Al Martin, 78, second baseman for the Brooklyn Eckfords (1872) and Brooklyn Atlantics (1874–75) of the National Association.
April 14 – Eddie Fusselback, 69, catcher/outfielder for the 1882 St. Louis Brown Stockings (AA), 1884 Baltimore Monumentals (UA), 1885 Philadelphia Athletics (AA) and 1888 Louisville Colonels (AA).
April 16 – George Chauncey, 78, owner of the 1890 Brooklyn Ward's Wonders and part-owner of the Brooklyn Grooms (1891–1896).
April 18 – George Haddock, 59, pitcher for seven seasons from 1888 to 1894, winning 34 games for the 1891 Boston Reds and 29 for the 1892 Brooklyn Grooms.
April 23 – Henry Schmidt, 52, pitcher for the 1903 Brooklyn Superbas (1903) of the National League.
April 27 – Charlie Abbey, 59, outfielder who played from 1893 through 1887 with the Washington Senators of the National League.
May 1 – Ed Conwell, 36, pinch-hitter for the 1911 St. Louis Cardinals.

June–August
June 4 – Sandy Griffin, 67, outfielder for the Broncos/Browns/Statesmen/Gothams in parts of four seasons spanning 1884–1893.
June 13 – Johnny Beall, 44, outfielder for the Cardinals/WhiteSox/Reds/Naps between 1913 and 1918.
June 18 – Alex Gardner, 65, Canadian catcher for the 1884 Washington Nationals of the American Association.
June 22 – Joe Crotty, 66, catcher for the Louisville Eclipse, St. Louis Brown Stockings, Cincinnati Outlaw Reds, Louisville Colonels and New York Metropolitans between the 1882 and 1886 seasons.
June 24 – Jim Gillespie, 64, outfielder for the 1890 Buffalo Bisons of the Players' League.
 August 7 – Moose Baxter, 50, first baseman for the 1907 St. Louis Cardinals.
August 19 – George Cobb, 60, pitcher for the 1892 Baltimore Orioles of the National League.
August 20 – Cal McVey, 75, early star with the 1869 Red Stockings who batted .431 in National Association's 1871 debut season, topped .300 mark through 1878; led National League in hits, RBI and total bases twice each, and in runs and doubles once.
August 23 – Emil Batch, 46, third baseman and left fielder for the Brooklyn Superbas between 1904 and 1907.

September–October
September 2 – Ed McDonough, 39, backup catcher for the Philadelphia Phillies from 1909 to 1910.
September 9 – Dick Conway, 60, pitcher/right fielder for the 1886 Baltimore Orioles and the 1887-88 Boston Beaneaters.
September 12 – Danny Richardson, 63, National League infielder/outfielder who played from 1884 through 1894 with the New York Gothams/Giants, Washington Senators and Brooklyn Grooms.
September 17 – Tom Drohan, 39, pitcher for the 1913 Washington Senators of the American League.
September 21 – Jim Keenan, 68, catcher/first baseman who played between 1875 and 1891 for the New Haven Elm Citys, Buffalo Bisons, Pittsburgh Alleghenys, Indianapolis Hoosiers, and the Cincinnati Red Stockings/Reds.
October 2 – Art Sunday, 64, right fielder for the 1890 Brooklyn Ward's Wonders of the Players' League.
October 5 – Al Burch, 42, outfielder for the St. Louis Cardinals and the Brooklyn Superbas/Dodgers from 1906-11.
October 5 – Howard Murphy, 44, backup centerfielder for the St. Louis Cardinals in the 1909 season.
October 6 – Holly Hollingshead, 73, center fielder/second baseman from 1872–1873, 1875 and manager in 1875 and 1884, for the National and Blue Legs teams in the Washington, D.C. area.
October 10 – Brownie Foreman, 51, pitcher for the Pittsburgh Pirates and Cincinnati Reds from 1895-96.
October 16 – Charlie Levis, 66, first baseman for the Baltimore Monumentals, Washington Nationals, Indianapolis Hoosiers and Baltimore Orioles between 1884 and 1885, and also a minor league player/manager during eight seasons spanning 1883-92.
October 22 – Jake Aydelott, 65, pitcher/centerfielder for the 1884 Indianapolis Hoosiers and the 1886 Philadelphia Athletics of the American Association.

November–December
November 2 – Bill Bailey, 38, pitcher for the St. Louis Browns, Baltimore Terrapins, Chicago Whales, Detroit Tigers and St. Louis Cardinals in parts of 11 seasons spanning 1907–1922.
November 10 – John Cattanach, 63, pitcher/right fielder who played for the Providence Grays and the St. Louis Maroons in the 1884 season.
November 10 – Ed Flanagan, 65, first baseman for the 1887 Philadelphia Athletics and the 1889 Louisville Colonels	 of the American Association.
November 10 – George Pinkney, 67, a daring base runner and steady third baseman, who played from 1884 to 1893 with the Cleveland Blues, Brooklyn Grays/Bridegrooms/Grooms, St. Louis Browns and Louisville Colonels, collecting a .263 average with 874 runs and 296 stolen bases in 1163 games, while leading the American Association in several statistical categories, including games played (1886, 1888), runs (1888), walks (1886), putouts (1886), assists (1887) and fielding percentage (1887, 1889).
November 13 – Frank Pearce, 66, pitcher for the 1876 Louisville Grays of the National League.
November 19 – Fred Smith, 61, pitcher for the 1890 Toledo Maumees of the American Association.
November 21 – John Shaffer, 62, pitcher who played from 1886 to 1887 for the New York Metropolitans of the American Association.
December 2 – Dave Skeels, 34, pitcher for the 1919 Detroit Tigers.
December 4 – Abel Lizotte, 56, first baseman for the 1896 Pittsburgh Pirates.
December 12 – Ed Sixsmith, 63, catcher for the 1884 Philadelphia Quakers of the National League.
December 14 – George Myers, 66, National League catcher/outfielder for the Buffalo Bisons, St. Louis Maroons and Indianapolis Hoosiers from 1884 to 1889.
December 14 – Tom Needham, 47, Irish catcher who played from 1904 through 1914 for the Boston Beaneaters/Doves, New York Giants and Chicago Cubs, collecting a .962 fielding average and a 45% of caught stealing in 465 career games, while gunning down a 60.5% percent of potential base stealers in 1911 to lead the National League.	
December 22 – Harry Weber, 64, backup catcher for the 1884 Indianapolis Hoosiers of the American Association.
December 26 – William Stecher, 57, pitcher and third baseman for the 1890 Philadelphia Athletics of the American Association.